Winkens is a surname. Notable people with the surname include:

Elke Winkens (born 1970), Austrian-German actress
Sjoerd Winkens (born 1983), Dutch footballer

See also
Wickens